Holopothrips is a genus of thrips in the family Phlaeothripidae.

Species
 Holopothrips acrioris
 Holopothrips affinis
 Holopothrips ananasi
 Holopothrips atlanticus
 Holopothrips balteatus
 Holopothrips bicolor
 Holopothrips brevicapitatum
 Holopothrips cardosoi
 Holopothrips carolinae
 Holopothrips chaconi
 Holopothrips claritibialis
 Holopothrips conducans
 Holopothrips curiosus
 Holopothrips elongatus
 Holopothrips erianthi
 Holopothrips ferrisi
 Holopothrips flavisetis
 Holopothrips fulvus
 Holopothrips graminis
 Holopothrips graziae
 Holopothrips hambletoni
 Holopothrips hilaris
 Holopothrips inconspicuus
 Holopothrips infestans
 Holopothrips inquilinus
 Holopothrips inversus
 Holopothrips irregularis
 Holopothrips jaboticabae
 Holopothrips johanseni
 Holopothrips kaminskii
 Holopothrips longihamus
 Holopothrips longisetus
 Holopothrips magnus
 Holopothrips maiae
 Holopothrips mariae
 Holopothrips molzi
 Holopothrips nigrisetis
 Holopothrips nigrum
 Holopothrips oaxacensis
 Holopothrips omercooperi
 Holopothrips orites
 Holopothrips paulus
 Holopothrips pennatus
 Holopothrips permagnus
 Holopothrips pictus
 Holopothrips porrosati
 Holopothrips punctatus
 Holopothrips reticulatus
 Holopothrips seini
 Holopothrips signatus
 Holopothrips singularis
 Holopothrips spermathecus
 Holopothrips stannardi
 Holopothrips striatus
 Holopothrips tabebuia
 Holopothrips tenuis
 Holopothrips tillandsiae
 Holopothrips tupi
 Holopothrips urinator
 Holopothrips varicolor

References

Phlaeothripidae
Thrips
Thrips genera